Perret may refer to:
 Perret, Côtes-d'Armor, a commune in France
 Auguste Perret (1874–1954), French architect
 Catherine Perret French Philosopher and Art Curator
 Craig Perret (born 1951), American jockey
 Henri Perret (born 1962) later known as Kelly Nickels, bass guitarist
 Henrik Perret (born 1946), Finish Lutheran pastor
 Jacques Perret, 16th century French architect and mathematician
 Jacques Perret (writer) (1901–1992), French writer
 Jean-Marc Perret (born 1975), English-born actor
 Léonce Perret (1880–1935), French film actor, director and producer
 Michèle Perret, French medieval linguistics professor and novelist
 Pierre Perret (born 1934), French singer

See also 
 Perrett, a surname